Harappa (Urdu/) is an archaeological site in Punjab, Pakistan, about  west of Sahiwal.  The Bronze Age Harappan civilisation, now more often called the Indus Valley Civilisation, is named after the site, which takes its name from a modern village near the former course of the Ravi River, which now runs  to the north. The core of the Harappan civilization extended over a large area, from Gujarat in the south, across Sindh and Rajasthan and extending into Punjab and Haryana. Numerous sites have been found outside the core area, including some as far east as Uttar Pradesh and as far west as Sutkagen-dor on the Makran coast of Baluchistan, not far from Iran.

The site of the ancient city contains the ruins of a Bronze Age fortified city, which was part of the Harappan civilisation centred in Sindh and the Punjab, and then the Cemetery H culture. Per archaeological convention of naming a previously unknown civilisation by its first excavated site, the Indus Valley Civilisation is also called the Harappan Civilisation.

The ancient city of Harappa was heavily damaged under British rule, when bricks from the ruins were used as track ballast in the construction of the Lahore–Multan Railway. Although modern Harappa has a legacy railway station from the British Raj period, it is a small crossroads town of 15,000 people today. In 2005, a controversial amusement park scheme at the site was abandoned when builders unearthed many archaeological artefacts during the early stages of building work.

History

The Harappan Civilisation has its earliest roots in cultures such as that of Mehrgarh, approximately 6000 BC. The two greatest cities, Mohenjo-daro and Harappa, emerged circa 2600 BC along the Indus River valley in Punjab and Sindh. The civilisation, with a possible writing system, urban centres, drainage infrastructure and diversified social and economic system, was rediscovered in the 1920s also after excavations at Mohenjo-daro in Sindh near Larkana, and Harappa, in west Punjab south of Lahore. A number of other sites stretching from the Himalayan foothills in the east Punjab, India in the north, to Gujarat in the south and east, and to Pakistani Balochistan in the west have also been discovered and studied. Although the archaeological site at Harappa was damaged in 1857 when engineers constructing the Lahore-Multan railroad used brick from the Harappa ruins for track ballast, an abundance of artefacts have nevertheless been found.
Because of the reducing sea-levels certain regions in late Harappan period were abandoned 
. Towards the end Harappan civilisation lost features such as writing and hydraulic engineering. As a result the Ganges Valley settlement gained prominence and Ganges cities developed.

The earliest recognisably Harappan sites date to 3500 BC. This early phase lasts till around 2600 BC. We then enter the Mature phase from 2600 BC to 2000 BC. This is when the great cities were at their height. Then, from around 2000 BC we have a steady disintegration that lasts till 1400 BC – what is usually called Late Harappan. There is no sign that the Harappan cities were laid waste by invaders. The evidence strongly points to natural causes. A number of studies show that the area which is today the Thar desert was once far wetter and that the climate gradually became drier.

Culture and economy

The Indus Valley civilization was basically an urban culture sustained by surplus agricultural production and commerce, the latter including trade with Elam and Sumer in southern Mesopotamia. Both Mohenjo-daro and Harappa are generally characterised as having "differentiated living quarters, flat-roofed brick houses, and fortified administrative or religious centers." Although such similarities have given rise to arguments for the existence of a standardised system of urban layout and planning, the similarities are largely due to the presence of a semi-orthogonal type of civic layout, and a comparison of the layouts of Mohenjo-Daro and Harappa shows that they are in fact, arranged in a quite dissimilar fashion.

The weights and measures of the Indus Valley Civilisation, on the other hand, were highly standardised, and conform to a set scale of gradations. Distinctive seals were used, among other applications, perhaps for the identification of property and shipment of goods. Although copper and bronze were in use, iron was not yet employed. "Cotton was woven and dyed for clothing; wheat, rice, and a variety of vegetables and fruits were cultivated; and a number of animals, including the humped bull, was domesticated," as well as "fowl for fighting".  Wheel-made pottery—some of it adorned with animal and geometric motifs—has been found in profusion at all the major Indus sites. A centralised administration for each city, though not the whole civilisation, has been inferred from the revealed cultural uniformity; however, it remains uncertain whether authority lay with a commercial oligarchy. Harappans had many trade routes along the Indus River that went as far as the Persian Gulf, Mesopotamia, and Egypt. Some of the most valuable things traded were carnelian and lapis lazuli.

What is clear is that Harappan society was not entirely peaceful, with the human skeletal remains demonstrating some of the highest rates of injury (15.5%) found in South Asian prehistory. Examinations of Harappan skeletons have often found wounds that are likely to have been inflicted in battle. Paleopathological analysis demonstrated that leprosy and tuberculosis were present at Harappa, with the highest prevalence of both disease and trauma present in the skeletons from Area G (an ossuary located south-east of the city walls). Furthermore, rates of craniofacial trauma and infection increased through time demonstrating that the civilisation collapsed amid illness and injury. The bioarchaeologists who examined the remains have suggested that the combined evidence for differences in mortuary treatment and epidemiology indicate that some individuals and communities at Harappa were excluded from access to basic resources like health and safety.

Trade
The Harappans had traded with ancient Mesopotamia, especially Elam, among other areas. Cotton textiles and agricultural products were the primary trading objects. The Harappan merchants also had procurement colonies in Mesopotamia as well as which served as trading centres. They also traded extensively with people living in southern India, near modern-day Karnataka, to procure gold and copper from them.

Archaeology

The excavators of the site have proposed the following chronology of Harappa's occupation:
Ravi Aspect of the Hakra phase, c. 3300 – 2800 BC.
Kot Dijian (Early Harappan) phase, c. 2800 – 2600 BC.
Harappan Phase, c. 2600 – 1900 BC.
Transitional Phase, c. 1900 – 1800 BC.
Late Harappan Phase, c. 1800 – 1300 BC.

By far the most exquisite and obscure artefacts unearthed to date are the small, square steatite (soapstone) seals engraved with human or animal motifs. A large number of seals have been found at such sites as Mohenjo-Daro and Harappa. Many bear pictographic inscriptions generally thought to be a form of writing or script. Despite the efforts of philologists from all parts of the world, and despite the use of modern cryptographic analysis, the signs remain undeciphered. It is also unknown if they reflect proto-Dravidian or other non-Vedic language(s). The ascribing of Indus Valley Civilisation iconography and epigraphy to historically known cultures is extremely problematic, in part due to the rather tenuous archaeological evidence for such claims, as well as the projection of modern South Asian political concerns onto the archaeological record of the area. This is especially evident in the radically varying interpretations of Harappan material culture as seen from both Pakistan- and India-based scholars.

In February 2006 a school teacher in the village of Sembian-Kandiyur in Tamil Nadu discovered a stone celt (tool) with an inscription estimated to be up to 3,500 years old.
 Indian epigraphist Iravatham Mahadevan postulated that the four signs were in the Indus script and called the find "the greatest archaeological discovery of a century in Tamil Nadu". Based on this evidence he goes on to suggest that the language used in the Indus Valley was of Dravidian origin. However, the absence of a Bronze Age in South India, contrasted with the knowledge of bronze making techniques in the Indus Valley cultures, calls into question the validity of this hypothesis.

The area of the late Harappan period consisted of areas of Daimabad, Maharashtra, and Badakshan regions of Afghanistan.

Early symbols similar to Indus script
Clay and stone tablets unearthed at Harappa, which were carbon-dated 3300–3200 BC., contain trident-shaped and plant-like markings. "It is a big question as to if we can call what we have found true writing, but we have found symbols that have similarities to what became Indus script" said Dr. Richard Meadow of Harvard University, Director of the Harappa Archeological Research Project. This primitive symbols is placed slightly earlier than the primitive writing of the Sumerians of Mesopotamia, dated c.3100 BC. These markings have similarities to what later became Indus Script which has not been completely deciphered yet.

Notes

The earliest radiocarbon dating mentioned on the web is 2725±185 BC (uncalibrated) or 3338, 3213, 3203 BC calibrated, giving a midpoint of 3251 BC. Kenoyer, Jonathan Mark (1991) Urban process in the Indus Tradition: A preliminary report. In Harappa Excavations, 1986–1990: A multidisciplinary approach to Second Millennium urbanism, edited by Richard H. Meadow: 29–59. Monographs in World Archaeology No.3. Prehistory Press, Madison Wisconsin.
Periods 4 and 5 are not dated at Harappa. The termination of the Harappan tradition at Harappa falls between 1900 and 1500 BC.
Mohenjo-daro is another major city of the same period, located in Sindhprovince of Pakistan. One of its most well-known structures is the Great Bath of Mohenjo-Daro.

See also
Charles Masson – First European explorer of Harappa
Mohenjo-daro
Mehrgarh
Ganeriwala
Dholavira
Lothal
Harappan architecture
Mandi, Uttar Pradesh
Sheri Khan Tarakai
Sokhta Koh
Kalibangan
Rakhigarhi
Taxila

References

External links

Harappa.com
Harappa.info 
"Harappa Town Planning"-article by Dr S. Srikanta Sastri
Art of the Bronze Age: Southeastern Iran, Western Central Asia, and the Indus Valley, an exhibition catalogue from The Metropolitan Museum of Art (fully available online as PDF), which contains material on Harappa

4th-millennium BC architecture
Archaeological sites in Punjab, Pakistan
History of Pakistan
Bronze Age sites
Populated places in Sahiwal District
Indus Valley civilisation
Indus Valley civilisation sites
Former populated places in Pakistan
Culture of Punjab, Pakistan
Sahiwal District
Tourist attractions in Sahiwal
Ruins in Pakistan
Lost cities and towns